Veronica japonensis is a species of flowering plant in the genus Veronica of the family Plantaginaceae. It was described by Tomitaro Makino.

References

External links 

japonensis
Flora of Japan